The La Huérguina Formation (also known as the Calizas de La Huérguina Formation, La Huérguina Limestone Formation or as the Una Formation) is a geological formation in Spain whose strata date back to the Barremian stage of the Early Cretaceous.
Las Hoyas is a Konservat-Lagerstätte within the formation, located near the city of Cuenca, Spain. The site is mostly known for its exquisitely preserved dinosaurs, especially enantiornithines. The lithology of the formation mostly consists of lacustarine limestone deposited in a freshwater wetland environment.

Las Hoyas

Taphonomy 
As a Konservat-Lagerstätten, the preservation is exceptional. This may be a result of three factors: Microbial mats, Obruption and Stagnation.

Microbial mats may be responsible for the preservation of soft tissue in many fossils from Las Hoyas, like Pelecanimimus' crest. The iron carbonate depositions, a result from bacterial metabolism which covered the dinosaur's crest enhanced the preservation of those soft tissues. Evidence of these mats comes from the studies on microfacies and the fossils themselves.

Obruption is notable in the formation, due to the presence of highly articulated specimens. From actuotaphonomy studies on several different organisms it can be estimated that the burial of most entities was quick. Concornis may have been buried in less than 15 days, after a period of sub-areal exposition.

Paleoenvironement 
Las Hoyas was an inland lacustrine environment which presents an important aquatic and terrestrial flora (with many specimens of Charophytes, Montsechia, Weischelia or Frenelopsis) and diverse fauna, with specimens of at least five or six Phyla: arthropods, molluscs, Chordata and many vermiform soft bodied animals which might be Nemertines or annelids.

Among vertebrates the most abundant and diverse group are fish. The presence of mostly articulated skeletons, exceptional preservation of tissue and lack of any other signs of transportation may indicate that these are demic and autochthonous entities (meaning that they lived and died in the same place where they fossilized).

Crocodylomorphs are the most abundant amniotes from Las Hoyas.

Dinosaurs from Las Hoyas (avian and non avian) are unique in many ways. The first ornithomimosaur dinosaur described in Europe, Pelecanimimus polyodon, shows some characters previously unknown in these dinosaurs which enhanced the knowledge on the evolution of the group, such as a high number of teeth. Concavenator corcovatus presents two unique features: very tall neural spines on the vertebrae near the hip, which look like a hump, and a structure on its forearm, which if homologous to quill knobs would push back the origin of feathers earlier in theropod evolution.

Las Hoyas birds are enantiornithes, the most diverse Cretaceous bird clade, which became extinct at the end of the period. Iberomesornis romerali shows both derived ("avian") and primitive ("dinosaurian") characters. Within the derived characters we can underline the presence of a pygostile, although it is still very large compared to that of modern neornithines and the presence of a quilled sternum. Eoalulavis hoyasi shows the first report of an alula or "bastard wing", which means it had a flight manoeuvrability analogous to that of modern birds.

Research 
The Las Hoyas site has been studied for more than two decades by researchers from the Universidad Autónoma de Madrid, the Universidad Complutense de Madrid and the National University of Distance Education, in collaboration with the Museo de las Ciencias de Castilla-La Mancha, which is responsible for the fossil record from the area.

Fossil content

Amphibians

Turtles

Squamates

Mammals

Crocodyliformes

Ornithodirans

Correlation

See also 
 List of dinosaur-bearing rock formations
 Paja Formation, contemporaneous Lagerstätte of Colombia
 Yixian Formation, contemporaneous Lagerstätte of China

References

Bibliography 
 
   
   
 Thomas Martin, Jesús Marugán-Lobón, Romain Vullo, Hugo Martín-Abad, Zhe-Xi Luo & Angela D. Buscalioni (2015). A Cretaceous eutriconodont and integument evolution in early mammals. Nature 526, 380–384. doi:10.1038/nature14905
 Ortega, F., Escaso, F. & Sanz, J. L. (2010): A bizarre, humped Carcharodontosauria (Theropoda) from the Lower Cretaceous of Spain Nature 467: 203-206. HTML abstract
  
 Sanz, José L.; Chiappe, Luis M.; Pérez Moreno, Bernardino P.; Buscalioni, Ángela D.; Moratalla, José J.; Ortega, Francisco & Poyato Ariza, Francisco J. (1996): An Early Cretaceous bird from Spain and its implications for the evolution of avian flight. Nature 382(6590): 442-445.  (HTML abstract)
 Pérez Moreno, B. P., Sanz, J. L., Buscalioni, A. D., Moratalla, J. J., Ortega, F., and Raskin-Gutman, D. (1994). "A unique multitoothed ornithomimosaur from the Lower Cretaceous of Spain." Nature, 30: 363-367. 
 Sanz, J. L. & Bonaparte, José F. (1992): A New Order of Birds (Class Aves) from the Lower Cretaceous of Spain. In: Jonathan J. Becker (ed.): Papers in Avian Paleontology Honoring Pierce Brodkorb. Natural History Museum of Los Angeles County Contributions in  Science 36: 38-49.
 Sanz, J. L. & Buscalioni, A.D. (1992): A new bird from the Early Cretaceous of Las Hoyas, Spain, and the early radiation of birds. Palaeontology 35(4): 829-845. PDF fulltext

External links 
 Las Hoyas site website

 
Geologic formations of Spain
Lower Cretaceous Series of Europe
Cretaceous Spain
Limestone formations
Marl formations
Lacustrine deposits
Cretaceous paleontological sites of Europe
Paleontology in Spain
Formations